Intrakat, one of the companies in Greece, established in 1987, is involved in large-scale construction projects, including civil engineering, infrastructure, telecom network, renewable energy, environmental and real estate development projects in both the public and private sectors.

Following the delivery of Paros and Karpathos airports (airport terminal, airside), Intrakat has been awarded in March 2017 by Fraport  Greece as the contractor to design and built all the refurbishment, remodelling and expansion works in 14 peripheral airports in Greece.

Intrakat is a member of the Intracom Holdings Group, one of the multinational technology groups in S.E Europe.

References

Construction and civil engineering companies of Greece
Companies listed on the Athens Exchange
Greek brands
Intracom Group